Coleophora bidentella is a moth of the family Coleophoridae. It is found in Canada, including Ontario.

References

bidentella
Moths described in 1941
Moths of North America